Fernando Haddad (born 25 January 1963) is a Brazilian academic and politician who has served as the Brazilian Minister of Finance since 1 January 2023. He was previously the Mayor of São Paulo from 2013 to 2016 and the Brazilian Minister of Education from 2005 to 2012. He was the Workers' Party candidate for President of Brazil in the 2018 election, replacing former President Luiz Inácio Lula da Silva, whose candidacy was barred by the Superior Electoral Court under the Clean Slate law. Haddad faced Jair Bolsonaro in the run-off of the election, and lost the election with 44.87% of the votes against Bolsonaro's 55.13%.

Haddad is of Greco-Syrian and Greco-Lebanese origin ("Melkite"), belonging to the Greek Orthodox Church of Antioch. He studied law, economics and philosophy at the University of São Paulo. He was Minister of Education from 2005 to 2012 in the cabinets of Luiz Inácio Lula da Silva and Dilma Rousseff.

Early life

Haddad was born in São Paulo, the second of three children of salesman Khalil Haddad, a Syrian Melkite Antiochian Greek Orthodox immigrant who emigrated to Brazil in 1948.

Haddad attended high school at Colégio Bandeirantes, and in 1981 entered the Law School of the University of São Paulo as an undergraduate.

Career
Haddad holds a master's degree in economics and a Doctorate in Philosophy from the University of São Paulo. His Master's dissertation was on socio-economic aspects of the Soviet Union, defended in 1990, whereas his doctorate thesis is concerned with Historical materialism, defended in 1996. He began his career as an investment analyst at Unibanco, but has devoted much of his career to public service. Haddad has been a consultant for the Fundação Instituto de Pesquisas Econômicas, an economics research institute, based at the School of Economics, Business and Accounting of the University of São Paulo, chief of staff to the Finance and Economic Development Secretary of the municipality of São Paulo, and a special advisor to the Ministry of Planning, Budget and Management. He is also a professor in the political science department of the University of São Paulo.

Haddad took over the cabinet position of Minister of Education on 29 July 2005, when his predecessor, Tarso Genro, left the position to become the chairman of the Workers' Party. In 2007, Haddad established the Basic Education Development Index (IDEB) to measure the quality of public primary and middle schools. Under Haddad's tenure as minister, the Lula administration implemented the University for Everyone Program (ProUni), which aims at offering scholarships for low-income students attending private universities. The Ministry also made several reforms to the National High School Exam (ENEM) so as to amplify its usage in university admissions. In 2009 Haddad's ministry became embroiled in controversy after that year's ENEM leaked, which forced the government to cancel the exam scheduled for October.

During the 2012 municipal elections, Haddad was a candidate for Mayor of São Paulo. After successfully advancing to the second round, he faced former mayor José Serra (who had received the most votes in the first round) and won with 55.57% of the valid votes. As Mayor, Haddad implemented an expansion of the city's network of bike lanes, promising to extend it from 64.7 km to 400 km in 2016. The project sparked polarized reactions by residents of São Paulo.

In June 2013, his administration faced widespread demonstrations, when São Paulo city hall and the government of the state of São Paulo (which runs the train and metro system of São Paulo) announced that bus fares would be raised from R$3.00 to R$3.20. The violent repression of these protests by the São Paulo state police generated a widespread reaction by the general population. The resulting 2013 protests were the second biggest movement in comparison with 2015 protests against President Dilma Rousseff.

In July 2016, Haddad had the approval of only 14% of city residents, the lowest for the end of a mayoral term since Celso Pitta in 2000. On 2 October 2016, Haddad lost his bid for re-election to Brazilian Social Democracy Party candidate  João Doria, receiving only 17% of the vote.  He left office on 1 January 2017.

In 2022, Haddad ran for governor of São Paulo with his running mate former first lady Lúcia França,  against Tarcísio de Freitas, a minister in the Bolsonaro administration. Haddad lost the election in the second round, winning 44.73% of the vote to Tarcísio's 55.27%.

After his election loss in São Paulo, Haddad was appointed Minister of Finance by fellow party member President Luiz Inácio Lula da Silva, following his victory in the 2022 presidential election.

2018 presidential election

Haddad was announced as Lula da Silva's running mate in the 2018 presidential election in August 2018. However, the Superior Electoral Court ruled on 31 August that the former president is ineligible for candidacy due to his being disqualified under the Clean Slate law, which bans people convicted on appeal from running for public office. Lula had been arrested in April after his conviction for corruption was upheld by the Federal Court of the Fourth Region. On 11 September 2018, Haddad was named by the Workers' Party as Lula's replacement, with Communist Party legislator Manuela d'Ávila taking Haddad's place as the vice presidential candidate.

Haddad came in second place in the first round of the election with 29% of the vote, behind Jair Bolsonaro, who had 46%. The two faced again in the run-off on 28 October 2018, in which Haddad placed second with 44.87% of the vote against Bolsonaro, who won the election.

Personal life

Haddad is an amateur guitar player and is occasionally seen in public gatherings with his trademark SG Gibson guitar.

During his mandate as mayor of São Paulo, he was nicknamed "Jaiminho" by Brazilian historian and radio host Marco Antonio Villa, an outspoken critic of Haddad's Workers' Party. Jaiminho is a reference to a character in Mexican sitcom El Chavo del Ocho, popular in Brazil.

Bibliography
Academic publications of Dr. Fernando Haddad include:

Notes

References

External links

São Paulo 2004 mayoral race pages
http://citymayors.com/mayors/saopaulo_mayor.html Profile on CityMayors.com

|-

|-

|-

|-

|-

1963 births
Living people
Brazilian Christian socialists
Brazilian people of Lebanese descent
Eastern Orthodox Christians from Brazil
Education Ministers of Brazil
Workers' Party (Brazil) politicians
University of São Paulo alumni
Academic staff of the University of São Paulo
Recipients of the Great Cross of the National Order of Scientific Merit (Brazil)
Mayors of São Paulo
Financial analysts
20th-century philosophers
Brazilian people of Arab descent
Finance Ministers of Brazil